Joseph Stanley Wendryhoski (March 1, 1939 – November 6, 2008) was a professional American football player who played guard for five seasons in the National Football League.

Wendryhoski was born on March 1, 1939, in West Frankfort, Illinois, where he attended Frankfort Community High School. He played college football at the University of Illinois from 1958 to 1961 and was voted all-Big Ten Conference in 1960.

At , 2-inches tall and 245 pounds, Wendryhoski played center and offensive guard. He was selected in the 1961 AFL draft by the New York Titans, but did not sign with the club; instead Wendryhoski played briefly for the BC Lions of the Canadian Football League that season.  He played three seasons (1964-66) for Los Angeles, appearing in a total of 31 games for the team. Left unprotected in the 1967 NFL Expansion Draft, he became an inaugural member of the New Orleans Saints. Wendryhoski anchored the Saints offense for two seasons (1967-68), playing every offensive snap as the starting center under head coach Tom Fears. He recovered a fumble for the Saints in 1968, the only fumble recovery of his career.

Wendryhoski, along with several of his Saints teammates, appeared in the film Number One, which starred Charlton Heston as a fading New Orleans quarterback.

After retiring from the Saints, Wendryhoski served as a vice president for the Saints Hall of Fame Museum (now located in the Louisiana Superdome) from its inception in 1988. Wendryhoski lived in Metairie, Louisiana, where he ran a real estate business, and also had a residence in Wisconsin.

He died at age 69 on November 6, 2008, in Twin Lakes, Wisconsin, after a brief battle with cancer.

References

External links

1939 births
2008 deaths
American football offensive guards
Canadian football offensive linemen
Illinois Fighting Illini football players
Los Angeles Rams players
New Orleans Saints players
BC Lions players
People from West Frankfort, Illinois
Deaths from cancer in Wisconsin
Players of American football from Illinois